The Goujon was a French automobile manufactured from 1896 until 1901. A four-seater voiturette, it featured an air-cooled 3½ hp engine.

References

1890s cars
Defunct motor vehicle manufacturers of France
Cars introduced in 1896